Gohar Ali Shah is a Pakistani politician hailing from Mardan District, who served as a member of the Khyber Pakhtunkhwa Assembly, belonging to the Awami National Party. He is also serving as member of the different committees.

Political career
Gohar was elected as the member of the Khyber Pakhtunkhwa Assembly on ticket of Awami National Party from PK-28 (Mardan-VI) in 2013 Pakistani general election.

References

Living people
People from Mardan District
Awami National Party politicians
Khyber Pakhtunkhwa MPAs 2013–2018
Year of birth missing (living people)